Alala, Hama  is a Syrian village located in Al-Hamraa Nahiyah in Hama District, Hama.  According to the Syria Central Bureau of Statistics (CBS), Alala, Hama had a population of 571 in the 2004 census.

References 

Populated places in Hama District